Calvin Thürkauf (born 27 June 1997) is a Swiss professional ice hockey forward who currently plays with HC Lugano in the National League (NL). Thurkauf was selected by the Blue Jackets in the seventh round (185th overall) of the 2016 NHL Entry Draft.

Playing career
Thürkauf as a youth played within the EV Zug junior ranks. In spending 5 seasons within Zug's development program, Thürkauf made his professional debut in the 2014–15 playoffs, appearing in one game on loan to SC Langenthal of the then second tier National League B (NLB).

With NHL aspirations, Thürkauf was selected 59th overall in the 2015 CHL Import Draft by the Kelowna Rockets of the Western Hockey League (WHL). In his first major junior season in North America, Thürkauf displayed his offensive potential in contributing with 18 goals and 45 points in 61 games as a rookie. He was selected in his second year of eligibility in the seventh-round, 185th overall, by the Columbus Blue Jackets in the 2016 NHL Entry Draft.

On 31 December 2016, Thürkauf was signed to a three-year, entry-level contract with the Blue Jackets. He placed second on team scoring in the 2016–17 season with the Rockets, establishing a career high 33 goals and 70 points in 60 regular season games.

In the final year of his entry-level contract with the Blue Jackets in the 2019–20 season, while playing with AHL affiliate, the Cleveland Monsters, Thürkauf received his first recall to the NHL on an emergency basis on 21 February 2020. He made his NHL debut with the Blue Jackets, appearing on the fourth-line, in a 4–3 shootout defeat to the Nashville Predators on 22 February 2020. He was returned to the AHL with the Monsters the following day.

As an impending restricted free agent and with the following 2020–21 North American season delayed due to the COVID-19 pandemic, Thürkauf was signed to a temporary contract with hometown Swiss club, EV Zug of the NL, on 24 August 2020.

On May 10, 2021, Thürkauf left the Blue Jackets organization and joined HC Lugano on a three-year deal through the 2023–24 season.

International play
Thürkauf has represented the Swiss national junior team at multiple tournaments. The first time he was selected to play for the national junior team, was during the 2014 Ivan Hlinka Memorial Tournament. He later captained Switzerland at the 2017 World Junior Championships in Canada, posting 4 points in 4 games in a 7th-placed finish.

Career statistics

Regular season and playoffs

International

References

External links

1997 births
Living people
Cleveland Monsters players
Columbus Blue Jackets draft picks
Columbus Blue Jackets players
Kelowna Rockets players
SC Langenthal players
HC Lugano players
Swiss expatriate ice hockey people
Swiss expatriate sportspeople in the United States
Swiss ice hockey right wingers
EV Zug players
People from Zug
Sportspeople from the canton of Zug